Bathymophila gravida is a species of sea snail, a marine gastropod mollusk in the family Solariellidae.

Description
The diameter of the shell attains 16 mm.

Distribution
This marine species is endemic to New Zealand and occurs at the Three Kings Rise at depths between 1082 m and 1570 m.

References

 Marshall, B.A. 1999: A revision of the Recent Solariellinae (Gastropoda: Trochoidea) of the New Zealand region. The Nautilus 113: 4-42

External links

gravida
Gastropods of New Zealand
Gastropods described in 1999